Siegfried III von Eppstein (died 9 March 1249) was Archbishop of Mainz from 1230 to 1249. He in 1244 granted freedom to the citizens of Mainz, who subsequently could run their affairs more independently though their own council; in law it remained an episcopal city.

He acted as regent for Conrad IV of Germany, while Emperor Frederick II was campaigning in Italy, 1237 to 1242. He was, though, a supporter of Pope Innocent IV. 

He held a major synod in 1239.

He added Lorsch Abbey to the archbishopric.

Notes

External links

 Tombstone
 
 The city rights privilege for Mainz dated 1244

1249 deaths
Archbishops of Mainz
Burials at Mainz Cathedral
Year of birth unknown